Jøsenfjorden is a village in Hjelmeland municipality in Rogaland county, Norway.  The village is located at the mouth of the river Ulla along the northern shore of the Jøsenfjorden.  The village is one of the few settlements along the shores of the fjord.  There is a small elementary school, shop, and chapel in the village.

References

Villages in Rogaland
Hjelmeland